The Gauja River Railway Bridge crosses the Gauja River in Ūdriņi, Latvia as part of the Riga–Valka–Pskov railway line. It was opened around 1889.

Where the bridge crosses the river there are small rapids named "Strenču", containing six steps, which can be navigated using canoes.

References 

Railway bridges in Latvia